The 1934 season was the fifth completed season of Finnish Football League Championship, known as the Mestaruussarja.

Overview

The 1934 Mestaruussarja  was contested by 8 teams, with HPS Helsinki winning the championship which was also known as the A-sarja. TPS Turku and UL Turku were relegated to the second tier which was known as the B-sarja.

League table

Results

References

Mestaruussarja seasons
Fin
Fin
1934 in Finnish football